Phosphinooxazolines (often abbreviated PHOX) are a class of chiral ligands used in asymmetric catalysis. Their complexes are particularly effective at generating single enatiomers in reactions involving highly symmetric transition states, such as allylic substitutions, which are typically difficult to perform stereoselectively.  The ligands are bidentate and have been shown to be hemilabile
with the softer P‑donor being more firmly bound than the harder N‑donor.

Synthesis
The synthesis of phosphinooxazolines is modular and it is not normally necessary to introduce the phosphine and oxazoline moieties in any particular order. However while examples exist of the phosphine being introduced first, it is more common to see the synthesis of a phenyloxazoline which is subsequently combined with a source of diphenylphosphine. Methods for doing this depend on the nature of the substituent in the X position:

 When X = fluorine coupling involves anionic displacement with a diphenylphosphine anion
 When X = bromine this can be converted into a Grignard reagent and reacted with chlorodiphenylphosphine, or coupled with diphenylphosphine via a copper iodide catalysed reaction.
 When X = hydrogen this undergoes directed ortho lithiation (facilitated by intramolecular coordination with the oxazoline) followed by reaction with chlorodiphenylphosphine

Of these methods the copper iodide catalysed reaction method is by far the simplest to carry out, as it does not require the synthesis of discrete anionic or organometallic species and is able to couple a wide range of materials in good to excellent yields.

In catalysis
Phosphinooxazolines are able to influence both the enantioselectivity and regioselectivity of a range of metal catalysed reactions. In reactions involving symmetric transition states these properties work in concert to induce asymmetry and thus promote the formation of a single product. Enantioselectivity is controlled by the chirality of the ligand which is normally located on the oxazoline ring, however the P-centre may also be stereogenic. Regioselectivity is controlled by variety of steric and electronic factors the most important of which being a form of trans effect, in which atoms complexed trans to the P‑atom become more electrophilic than ones located trans to the N‑atom. This is caused by the P‑atom engaging in back bonding, as it is a π‑electron acceptor.

Allylic substitutions

Phosphinooxazolines are used as ligands in allylic substitution reactions as both enantio- and regioselectivity is required to give an enantiomerically pure product due to the transition state being highly symmetric. In the example below all additions are enantioselective however the symmetric complex has no regiocontrol, resulting in a racemic product. The asymmetric complex is both regioselective and enantioselective, resulting in a single enantiomer.

The primary application of PHOX ligands is in palladium catalysts used for enantioselective allylic substitutions. They are able to effect a wide range of substitutions including allylic alkylations (Tsuji-Trost reaction), aminations and sulfonylations.

Heck Reaction

Palladium complexes containing chiral phosphinooxazolines have been shown to be efficient catalysts for the Heck reaction.  High yields and good to excellent enantioselectivities have been obtained, with the formation of by-products via C=C bond migration being greatly reduced. Pd-PHOX catalysts have also been used for intramolecular Heck reactions and examples exist where they have been shown to be superior to more common ligands such as BINAP.

Asymmetric Hydrogenation

The high enantio- and regiocontrol afforded by phosphinooxazoline ligands has fuelled research into their use for asymmetric hydrogenation. Iridium complexes incorporating phosphinooxazoline ligands have been shown to be effective for 'classic' hydrogenation using H2, with ruthenium and palladium catalysts having also been investigated for transfer hydrogenation. In addition to theoretical studies, the structural and kinetic properties of Ir-PHOX complexes have been investigated to better understand their behaviour as hydrogenation catalysts.

See also
Other oxazoline based ligands
 (S)-iPr-PHOX - A specific PHOX ligand
 Bisoxazolines (BOX)
 Trisoxazolines (TRISOX)
Structurally related ligands
 Trost ligand
 Diphenyl-2-pyridylphosphine

References

Catalysis
Coordination chemistry
Ligands
Oxazolines
Phosphines